Roseana Sarney Murad (born 1 June 1953) is a Brazilian politician and sociologist. She was the governor of the Brazilian state of Maranhão from 1995 to 2002 and again from 2009 to 2014. She is a member of the Brazilian Democratic Movement Party and daughter of former President and senator José Sarney.

Roseana has served in a number of elected offices, including congresswoman from 1991 to 1994, governor of Maranhão from 1995 to 2002 and senator from 2003 to 2009. She considered running for president in 2002, but a corruption scandal led to her withdrawal from the race on 15 April 2002.

References

External links 
Bank Julius Baer: Brazilian Senator Roseana Sarney estimated USD 150M in Caymans, 1999 

1953 births
Living people
People from São Luís, Maranhão
Governors of Maranhão
Brazilian Democratic Movement politicians
Brazilian people of Portuguese descent
Democratic Social Party politicians
Women state governors of Brazil
Children of presidents of Brazil